Steven Daniel Hendrickson (August 30, 1966 – January 8, 2021) was an American professional football player who was a linebacker in the National Football League (NFL). Hendrickson attended Napa High School where he was an outstanding varsity player during all four years at the school. His No. 30 jersey remains the only one ever retired by the school. He played college football for the California Golden Bears where he graduated with a major in history. He was named defensive player of the game at the 1988 Blue–Gray Football Classic and was drafted in the sixth round of the 1989 NFL Draft by the San Francisco 49ers. He played seven NFL seasons for the San Francisco 49ers, Dallas Cowboys, San Diego Chargers, Houston Oilers and Philadelphia Eagles. Hendrickson was a member of the San Francisco 49ers when they won their fourth Super Bowl XXIV on January 28, 1990. During his professional career, he played various positions despite his relatively small stature. With the Chargers Hendrickson was used as a short-yardage, goal-line running back, despite being a defensive player. He scored on a 1-yard run against the Kansas City Chiefs in a January 1993 playoff game in San Diego, to cap off a 17–0 shutout.

Personal life

Hendrickson resided in Napa, California. He has two children, Courtney and Kyle, who graduated from the University of California and Fresno State University respectively. Hendrickson suffered several concussions during his playing years. He suffered from many of the same symptoms as other former NFL players who have been diagnosed with trauma-related brain injuries resulting from concussions during their playing years. He collected disability payments from the Social Security Administration in addition to a disability pension from the NFL Player Retirement Plan. The NFL pension plan's six-person board determined his injuries were "non-football related", which made him ineligible for enhanced benefits.

Hendrickson's nephew, Dave Lewis, confirmed that Hendrickson died on January 8, 2021, at his home in Nampa, Idaho.

References

Steve Hendrickson, TE at NFL.com

1966 births
2021 deaths
Sportspeople from Richmond, California
People from Napa, California
American football linebackers
California Golden Bears football players
San Francisco 49ers players
Dallas Cowboys players
San Diego Chargers players
Houston Oilers players
Philadelphia Eagles players
Sportspeople from Escondido, California
Players of American football from California